Saint Patrick's Day is a cultural and religious celebration held on March 17. 

Saint Patrick's Day or Patrick's Day may also refer to:
 St. Patrick's Day (album), an album by Bing Crosby
 Patrick's Day (film), a 2014 Irish film
 St Patrick's Day (play), an 18th-century British play
 "St. Patrick's Day" (The Office), an episode of The Office
 "St. Patrick's Day" (30 Rock), an episode of 30 Rock
 Saint Patrick's Day Test, a rugby match

See also
 The Great St. Patrick’s Day Flood, a 1936 flood in Pittsburgh
The Great Saint Patrick's Day Flood, a children's novel about this event
 List of films set around St. Patrick's Day
 List of St. Patrick's Day television specials
 Live on St. Patrick's Day from Boston, MA, an album by Dropkick Murphys
 2012 St. Patrick's Day beating, an American crime
 The Saint Patrick's Day Four, American peace activists
 St. Patrick's Day festival Coatbridge, a Scottish event
 Saint Patrick's Day in the United States, various American celebrations and traditions
 St. Patrick's Day Parade (New York), one of these
 Milwaukee Saint Patrick's Day Parade, one of these
 Saint Patrick's Day Parade (Utica, NY), one of these
 St. Patrick's Day Parade Scranton, one of these
 Holyoke Saint Patrick's Day Parade, one of these
 St. Patrick's Day Snowstorm, an 1892 American storm